For the song see Seminole Wind (song)

Seminole Wind is the twelfth studio album by American country music artist John Anderson, released on February 11, 1992. This is also known as his comeback album. It features the singles: "Who Got Our Love", "Straight Tequila Night", "Let Go of the Stone", "When It Comes to You", and the title track, all of which (Except for "Who Got Our Love") reached the country top ten, and the second of which was his first number one country hit since "Black Sheep" in 1983. This is also Anderson's highest-certified album, having achieved 2× Platinum certification by the RIAA. This was also Anderson's first album for BNA Records.

"Steamy Windows" was originally recorded by Tina Turner in 1989, and was later recorded by Kenny Chesney on his 1997 album I Will Stand. In addition, "Seminole Wind" was recorded by James Taylor on his 2008 release Covers.

Track listing

Production
Produced by James Stroud
Recorded & Mixed by Lynn Peterzell, Julian King and John Kunz
Mastered by Glenn Meadows
Digital Editing by Milan Bogdan

Personnel
John Anderson – lead vocals, banjo, harmonica
Mark Casstevens – acoustic guitar on "Straight Tequila Night"
Buddy Emmons – steel guitar
Sonny Garrish – steel guitar and Dobro on "Straight Tequila Night"
Dann Huff – electric guitar
Carl Jackson – backing vocals
Jana King – backing vocals
Mark Knopfler – electric guitar on "When It Comes to You"
Gary Lunn – bass guitar on "Straight Tequila Night"
Milton Sledge – drums
Gary W. Smith – keyboards, piano, synthesizer
Joe Spivey – fiddle
James Stroud – drums on "Straight Tequila Night"
Billy Joe Walker Jr. – acoustic guitar
Glenn Worf – bass guitar
Curtis Young – backing vocals

Chart performance

Weekly charts

Singles

Year-end charts

References

1992 albums
John Anderson (musician) albums
BNA Records albums
Albums produced by James Stroud